German submarine U-444 was a Type VIIC U-boat of Nazi Germany's Kriegsmarine during World War II.

She carried out two patrols, and was a member of three wolfpacks, but sank no ships.

She was sunk by Allied warships in mid-Atlantic on 11 March 1943.

Design
German Type VIIC submarines were preceded by the shorter Type VIIB submarines. U-444 had a displacement of  when at the surface and  while submerged. She had two shafts and two  propellers.

U-444 was fitted with five  torpedo tubes (four fitted at the bow and one at the stern), fourteen torpedoes, one  SK C/35 naval gun, 220 rounds, and a  C/30 anti-aircraft gun. The boat had a complement of between forty-four and sixty.

Service history
The submarine was laid down on 10 February 1941 at Schichau-Werke in Danzig (now Gdansk) as yard number 1499, launched on 26 February 1942 and commissioned on 9 May under the command of Oberleutnant zur See Albert Langfeld.

She served with the 8th U-boat Flotilla from 9 May 1942 for training, during which time U-444 accidentally rammed and sank U-612, and the 3rd flotilla from 1 January 1943 for operations.

First patrol
U-444s first patrol began from Kiel in Germany on 17 December 1942. She headed for the Atlantic Ocean, via the gap separating the Faroe and Shetland Islands. She arrived at La Pallice in occupied France on 3 February 1943.

Second patrol and loss
U-444 left La Pallice on 1 March 1943; on the 11th she was sunk in mid-Atlantic by a combination of depth charges and ramming by the British destroyer  and the Free .

Forty-one men went down with U-444; there were four survivors.

Wolfpacks
U-444 took part in three wolfpacks, namely:
 Falke (28 December 1942 – 19 January 1943) 
 Landsknecht (19 – 24 January 1943) 
 Neuland (8 – 11 March 1943)

References

Bibliography

External links

German Type VIIC submarines
U-boats commissioned in 1942
U-boats sunk in 1943
U-boats sunk by British warships
U-boats sunk by French warships
1942 ships
Ships built in Danzig
World War II submarines of Germany
World War II shipwrecks in the Atlantic Ocean
U-boat accidents
Maritime incidents in August 1942
Maritime incidents in March 1943
Ships built by Schichau